Boankra is a town in south-central Ghana.

Transport 
It is served by a station on the eastern network of Ghana Railways.

The proposed Boankra Inland Port is to be situated at this site linking the ports of Tema and Takoradi to the inner parts of the country and the landlocked countries of Burkina Faso, Mali and Niger.

See also 
 Railway stations in Ghana

References 

Populated places in Ghana